DiCaprio or Di Caprio is an Italian surname. Notable people with the surname include:

George DiCaprio (born 1943), American writer, editor, publisher, distributor, and former performance artist
Leonardo DiCaprio (born 1974), American actor and film producer

Occupational surnames
Italian-language surnames